Anselm Ahlfors (29 December 1897 – 13 August 1974) was a Finnish wrestler and Olympic medalist in Greco-Roman wrestling.

Olympics
Ahlfors competed at the 1924 Summer Olympics in Paris where he won a silver medal in Greco-Roman wrestling, the bantamweight class.

References

External links
Anselm Ahlfors' profile at Sports Reference.com

1897 births
1974 deaths
Olympic wrestlers of Finland
Wrestlers at the 1924 Summer Olympics
Wrestlers at the 1928 Summer Olympics
Finnish male sport wrestlers
Olympic silver medalists for Finland
Olympic medalists in wrestling
Medalists at the 1924 Summer Olympics
People from Kotka
Sportspeople from Kymenlaakso
19th-century Finnish people
20th-century Finnish people